Thomson Reuters Lipper (part of Thomson Reuters) is an American financial services firm. Founded in 1973 as Lipper Analytical Services, it was acquired by Reuters in 1998.

Corporate history
Lipper Analytical Services was founded in 1973 by securities analyst A. Michael Lipper.  The company's initial focus was to provide data and analysis to mutual funds companies in the United States. In subsequent years, Lipper Analytical Services expanded via growth and acquisitions. In 1998, Lipper Analytical was acquired by Reuters Group PLC as a wholly owned subsidiary. In April 2008, Lipper became part of Thomson Reuters when Thomson Financial and Reuters merged. The Lipper Fiduciary Services and competitive business unit known as Lipper FMI was purchased by Broadridge Financial Solutions in May 2015.

Acquired companies that have operated under the Lipper brand include:

 Hardwick Stafford Wright Limited (HSW) - supplier of fund performance information to the UK industry
 BOPP ISB AG -  Swiss provider of fund performance and analysis
 CAMRA -  supplier of fund portfolio information and analysis
 BT Alex Brown Investment Trusts - data business, a division of Bankers Trust International Plc
 Fitzrovia International - a UK based provider of fund fees and expenses research
 HedgeWorld - news, research and analysis on global hedge funds
 TASS Research - hedge fund performance database. 
 FERI Fund Market Information Ltd - European fund market research specialist.
AMG Data Services - U.S. based mutual fund flows data provider
Globe and Mail Mutual Fund Database - tracker of Canadian mutual fund performance 

Lipper provides retirement plan analysis and reporting tools for financial advisors and research from its offices in the Americas, Europe, Asia and the Middle East.

Fund ratings and indices
Lipper Leaders Rating System

The Lipper Leaders Rating System is a mutual fund rating system that uses investor-centered criteria, such as capital preservation, expense and consistent return. Funds are rated on a numeric scale of 5 to 1, with ‘5’ representing funds with the highest rating or Lipper Leaders, and ‘1’ representing the lowest rated funds.

The Lipper Ratings are derived from formulas that analyze funds against defined criteria. Funds are compared to similar funds within a peer group.  Each fund is ranked against its peers based on the metric used (such as Total Return or Expense), and the highest 20% of funds in each peer group are named Lipper Leaders, the next 20% receive a rating of 4, the middle 20% are rated 3, the next 20% are rated 2, and the lowest 20% are rated 1. While Lipper Leader Ratings are not predictive of future performance, they are designed to provide context and perspective for making knowledgeable fund investment decisions.

The ratings are subject to change every month and are calculated for the following periods: three-year, five-year, ten-year, and overall. The overall calculation is based on an equal-weighted average of percentile ranks for each metric over three-, five-, and ten-year periods (if applicable).

The Lipper Ratings metrics: Total Return, Consistent Return, Preservation, Tax Efficiency (US Only), and Expense

Lipper Indices

Lipper Indices are a set of benchmarking tools used to track, monitor and analyze fund performance.  Several of Lipper's 160 indices for the open-end, closed-end, and variable annuity universes track performance since the early 1960s.

Indices: Lipper Sector Indices, Thomson Reuters Lipper Optimal Indices, Thomson Reuters Lipper Premium Indices, Lipper Active Indices

Lipper Fund Awards
The Lipper Fund Awards were acquired by the Reuters Group as part of its 1998 purchase of Lipper Analytical. Following the merger of Thomson Financial and Reuters, in April 2008, Lipper became part of Thomson Reuters. In 2018, following over 30 years of mutual fund awards, the Lipper Fund Awards again transferred, from Thomson Reuters to Refinitiv, as part of the Reuters divestiture of its financial and risk unit to U.S. private equity firm, the Blackstone Group.

Research report series
Lipper publishes fund research reports monthly, quarterly and annually, including Fund Market Insight Reports, Fund Flows Insight Reports and Fund Industry Insight Reports.

Lipper also publishes fiduciary research reports and hedge fund research reports.

See also
Thomson Reuters
Lipper average
Nationally Recognized Statistical Rating Organization

References

External links
 Official website

Financial services companies based in New York City
Thomson Reuters
1973 establishments in New York City
Financial services companies established in 1973
1998 mergers and acquisitions